Gobitrichinotus radiocularis is a species of goby which is found in the Indian and Pacific oceans, including the Ryukyu Islands in Japan, Philippines, the Solomon Islands, French Polynesia, and Vanuatu.

Description
This species of goby can reach a length of  TL. The caudal fin is rounded. It has 5 dorsal spines, between 18 and 19 dorsal soft rays, 1 anal spine, and 14 anal soft rays.

Habitat
Gobitrichinotus radiocularis inhabits salt, brackish, and fresh waters. It lives in shallow areas with substrates of fine coral sand or muddy sand, in which it burrows.

References

Gobitrichinotus
Fish described in 1943
Taxa named by Henry Weed Fowler